The 2017 Desert T20 Challenge was an international Twenty20 International (T20I) cricket tournament that was held in Dubai and Abu Dhabi from 14 to 20 January 2017. The eight Associate Members that have T20I status were scheduled to take part, although Papua New Guinea declined to participate and were replaced by Namibia (who did not have T20I status at the time). Therefore, matches with Namibia were played as Twenty20 matches.

The fixtures for the tournament were confirmed by the Emirates Cricket Board (ECB) in December 2016. The eight teams were split into two groups of four teams, with Afghanistan, Ireland, Namibia and the United Arab Emirates in Group A and Netherlands, Scotland, Oman and Hong Kong in Group B. The semi-finals and final of the tournament took place at the Dubai International Cricket Stadium on 20 January.

Afghanistan and Ireland qualified from Group A and Scotland and Oman qualified from Group B for the finals stage of the tournament. Afghanistan beat Ireland by 10 wickets in the final match to win the tournament.

Teams

Squads

Before the tournament started, both Andrew Balbirnie and Stuart Thompson were ruled out of Ireland's squad due to injury. They were replaced by Stuart Poynter and Lorcan Tucker respectively.

Fixtures

Group A

Group B

Finals

Statistics

Most runs

Most wickets

See also
 ICC World Twenty20 Qualifier

References

External links
 Series home at ESPN Cricinfo

2017 in Emirati cricket
International cricket competitions in 2016–17
International cricket competitions in the United Arab Emirates
January 2017 sports events in Asia